The AAU James E. Sullivan Award, presented by the Amateur Athletic Union (AAU), is awarded annually to "the most outstanding athlete at the collegiate or Olympic level in the United States".  

The award was established in 1930 in honor of the organization's founder and past president, James Edward Sullivan. Based on the qualities of leadership, character, and sportsmanship, the AAU Sullivan Award "goes far beyond athletic accomplishments and honors those who have shown strong moral character".  Finalists are selected from public nominations following a review by the AAU Sullivan Award Executive Committee.  Approximately 10 semi-finalists are chosen, and the eventual winner is determined by votes from various members of the nationwide news media, former winners and AAU personnel. More recently, a portion of the winner's vote has been determined by the general public.  Recipients are eligible for subsequent awards, although this has yet to happen.

The inaugural winner of the award was golfer Bobby Jones, winner of 13 majors between 1923 and 1930.  The first female recipient, in 1944, was swimmer Ann Curtis, who won more national AAU championships than any other woman.

34 track and field athletes have won the AAU Sullivan Award -- the most by any sport. Notable winners include Carl Lewis, Jackie Joyner-Kersee, and Michael Johnson. 12 swimmers have won, including Mark Spitz and Michael Phelps. Nine football players have won the award, among them Peyton Manning and Tim Tebow. Seven basketball players have taken home the trophy, including Chamique Holdsclaw, J.J. Redick and Breanna Stewart. Five wrestlers have won, four figure skaters have won, and four gymnasts have taken home the award, including Simone Biles. Three divers and three speed skaters have won, as well as two oarsmen, two golfers, and two volleyball players. There's been one Paralympian, one ultra-marathoner, one baseball player, and one tennis player to win the prestigious award. And in December of 2022, Carissa Moore became the first surfer to take home the trophy. (Numbers as of 2022)

Winners

Notes

References

External links

Amateur Athletic Union
American sports trophies and awards
Awards established in 1930
Sportsmanship trophies and awards